Yunnanilus jinxiensis is a species of ray-finned fish, a stone loach in the genus Yunnanilus. It is found in the Pearl River drainage in Guangxi and its type locality is Ludon village in Jingxi County, its specific name refers to Jingxi County.

References

J
Taxa named by Zhu Yu (ichthyologist)
Taxa named by Du Li-Na
Taxa named by Chen Xiao-Yong 
Taxa named by Yang Jun-Xing
Fish described in 2009